Daisy is a feminine given name. The flower name comes from the Old English word dægeseage, meaning "day's eye". The name Daisy is therefore ultimately derived from this source. Daisy is also a nickname for Margaret because Marguerite, the French version of the latter name, is also a French name for the oxeye daisy.

Popularity 
The name came into popular use in the late Victorian era along with other flower names. Linda Rosenkrantz and Pamela Redmond Satran wrote in their 2007 book Baby Name Bible that Daisy has a "fresh, wholesome, and energetic" image. The name has been used for literary characters such as Daisy Miller, the title character of the novella by Henry James. In Louisa May Alcott's Little Women, a character named Margaret is "Meg" to her family, but "Daisy" to her wealthy would-be-friends. In television, Daisy Duke on The Dukes of Hazzard wears very short, form-fitting, denim cut-off jeans shorts, now often called Daisy Dukes after this character.

 

The name was in steady use for American girls throughout the 20th century and was ranked among the top 200 names for girls between 1900 and 1940. It declined in popularity between 1960 and 1980, but has been climbing in popularity since the 1980s and has again ranked among the top 200 names for American girls since 1990. It was the 294th most common name for all females during the 1990 United States census. Daisy has ranked among the top 100 names for girls in the United Kingdom since 1996 and in the past decade in Australia, Ireland, and New Zealand.

People
Daisy, Princess of Pless (1873–1943), socialite
Daisy Aitkens (born 1986), English actress, writer, and director
Daisy Al-Amir (born 1935), Iraqi writer, poet, and novelist
Daisy Alik-Momotaro, Marshallese politician
Daisy Andrews (c. 1934 or 1935–2015), Australian painter
Daisy and Violet Hilton (1908–1969), English entertainers, who were conjoined twins
Daisy Ascher (1944– 2003), Mexican photographer
Daisy Ashford (1881–1972), English writer
Daisy Avellana (1917–2013), Filipino stage actress and theater director
Daisy Ba-ad, Filipino playwright, director, composer, motivational speaker, and life coach
Daisy Bacon (1898–1986), American pulp fiction magazine editor and writer
Daisy Baez (born 1959), American Democratic politician 
Daisy Bates (disambiguation), multiple people
Daisy Beaumont (born 1974), English actress
Daisy Betts (born 1982), Australian actress
Daisy Bevan (born 1992), English actress
Daisy Bindi (1904–1962), Aboriginal Australian Indigenous rights activist
Daisy Blanche King (1875–1947), American painter and sculptor
Daisy Bopanna (born 1982), Indian actress
Daisy Burrell (1892–1982), English stage and film actress and musical theatre performer
Daisy Calhoun (1863–1949), American socialite and hostess
Daisy Campbell, British silent film actress
Daisy Christodoulou, educational researcher
Daisy Cleverley (born 1997), New Zealand footballer
Daisy Cocco De Filippis (born 1949), American community college president
Daisy Coleman (1997–2020), American sexual abuse victim advocate
Daisy Cooper (born 1981), British politician
Daisy Cordell, British silent film actress
Daisy Coulam, British television producer and screenwriter
Daisy Curwen (1889–1982), British swimmer
Daisy Danjuma (born 1952), Nigerian politician
Daisy Dares You (born 1993), British singer and songwriter
Daisy Davis (1858–1902), American baseball pitcher
Daisy de Bock (born 1974), Belgian sport shooter
Daisy DeBolt (1945–2011), Canadian singer, musician, and songwriter
Daisy Dee (born 1970), Dutch singer, actress, T.V. host, stylist, and television producer
Daisy de Melker (1886–1932), South African nurse
Daisy de Peinder (born 1976), Dutch softball player
Daisy Dern, American country music artist
Daisy Devan (1928–2009), Singaporean businesswoman
Daisy Dick (born 1972), British three-day eventing rider
Daisy Donovan (born 1973), English television presenter, actress, and writer
Daisy Door (born 1944), German Schlager music singer
Daisy Dormer (1883–1947), English music hall singer
Daisy Douglas Barr (1875–1938), Imperial Empress (leader) of the Indiana Women's Ku Klux Klan
Daisy Dunn (born 1987), English author, classicist, and critic
Daisy E. Nirdlinger (1879–1950), American businesswoman and children's book author
Daisy Eagan (born 1979), American actress
Daisy Earles (1907–1980), German actress
Daisy Edgar-Jones (born 1998), English actress
Daisy Ejang, Ugandan singer
Daisy Elizabeth Adams Lampkin (1883–1965), American suffragist, civil rights activist, organization executive, and community practitioner
Daisy Elizabeth McQuigg Sewell (1876–1944), American religious leader
Daisy Elizabeth Platts-Mills (1868–1956), New Zealand doctor and community leader
Daisy Elliott (1917–2015), African-American politician
Daisy Eris Campbell (born 1978), British writer, actress, and theatre director
Daisy Exposito-Ulla, Cuban-born advertising agency executive
Daisy Fancourt (born 1990), British researcher
Daisy Fellowes (1890–1962), society beauty and fashion icon
Daisy Fisher (1888–1967), English novelist and playwright
Daisy Fried (born 1967), American poet
Daisy Fuentes (born 1966), Cuban television host and model
Daisy Hernández Gaytán, Mexican politician
Daisy Hendley Gold (1893–1975), American author and journalist
Daisy Gardner (born 1976), American television writer and comedian
Daisy Goodwin (born 1961), British writer and television producer
Daisy Grace, American woman accused in 1912 of killing her husband and found not guilty
Daisy Granados (born 1942), Cuban film actress
Daisy Greville, Countess of Warwick (1861–1938), British socialite and mistress of Albert Edward, Prince of Wales (later King Edward VII)
Daisy Hage (born 1993), Dutch handball player
Daisy Haggard (born 1978), British actress
Daisy Harcourt, English comedian
Daisy Hasan, Indian-English author from Meghalaya
Daisy Hay, British writer
Daisy Head (born 1991), English actress
Daisy Hendley Gold (1893–1975), American writer, poet, and journalist
Daisy Hernández (born 1975), American writer and editor
Daisy Hernández Gaytán (born 1983), Mexican politician
Daisy Hill Northcross (1881–1956), American physician, hospital administrator
Daisy Hooee (1906 or 1910–1994 or 1998), Hopi-Tewa potter
Daisy Hurst Floyd (born 1956), American lawyer, law professor, and law school dean
Daisy Igel (1926/1927–2019), Brazilian architect and billionaire heiress
Daisy Irani (actress), Indian actress in Hindi and Telugu language films
Daisy Irani, Indian television actress, director, and producer
Daisy Jefferson (1889–1967), American actress
Daisy Jenks (born 1991), English filmmaker and videographer
Daisy Johnson (writer) (born 1990), British novelist and short story writer
Daisy Jopling (born 1969), British classical/rock violinist
Daisy Jugadai Napaltjarri (c. 1955–2008), Australian Indigenous artist
Daisy Junor (1919–2012), Canadian baseball player
Daisy Kadibil (1923–2018), Aboriginal Australian woman whose experiences shaped media
Daisy Kaitano (born 1993), Zimbabwean footballer
Daisy Kennedy (1893–1981), Australian-born concert violinist
Daisy Kessler Biermann (1874–1963), magazine and newspaper writer, a painter, and a pianist
Daisy Khan, Muslim activist
Daisy Kyaw Win, Burmese actress
Daisy Lang (born 1972), Bulgarian martial artist
Daisy Lawler (born 1942), American politician
Daisy Lee Bitter (born 1928), American science educator
Daisy Lewis, British actress and producer
Daisy Linda Ward (1883–1937), American still life painter
Daisy Li Yuet-Wah, Hong Kong journalist
Daisy Lowe (born 1989), English fashion model
Daisy Lumini (1936–1993), Italian composer, singer, and stage actress
Daisy Makeig-Jones (1881–1945), pottery designer for Wedgwood, best known for her Fairyland Lustre series
Daisy Mallory (born 1993), American country music singer-songwriter
Daisy Marchisotti (1904–1987), Australian social and political activist
Daisy Marguerite Hughes (1883–1968), American painter and lithographer
Daisy Martey, British singer, songwriter, playwright, and screenwriter
Daisy Martin (fl. c. 1914– c. 1925), American actress and blues singer
Daisy Martinez (born 1958?), actress, model, chef, host of the PBS T.V. show Daisy Cooks! and author
Daisy Masterman (born 1990), Australian actress
Daisy Maud Bellis (1887–1971), American painter
Daisy Maude Orleman Robinson (1869–1942), American medical doctor decorated for her work during World War I
Daisy May Cooper (born 1986), English actress and writer
Daisy May Pratt Erd (1882–1925), Canadian-born American songwriter, composer, and naval veteran
Daisy May Queen (born 1965), Argentine radio host, former television presenter, and writer
Daisy McAndrew (born 1972), English journalist
Daisy McCrackin (born 1981), American actress and singer-songwriter
Daisy Morales (born 1960), American politician
Daisy Myers (1925–2011), African American educator
Daisy Nakalyango (born 1994), Ugandan badminton player
Daisy Newman (1904–1994), American novelist
Daisy Nyongesa (born 1989), Kenyan senator
Daisy Ocasio (born 1964), Puerto Rican boxer and athlete
Daisy Osakue (born 1996), Italian discus thrower
Daisy Osborn (1888–1957), New Zealand painter, illustrator, and jewelry designer
Daisy Parsons (1890–1957), British suffragette
Daisy Pearce (born 1988), Australian footballer
Daisy Pirovano (born 1977), Italian politician
Daisy Platts-Mills (1868–1956), New Zealand doctor and community leader
Daisy Polk (1874–1963), American-born French countess
Daisy Postgate (1892–1971), British political activist
Daisy Quezada Ureña (born 1990), American visual artist and educator
Daisy Reyes, Filipino beauty queen
Daisy Richards Bisz (1909–2007), American attorney
Daisy Ridgley (1909–?), English athlete
Daisy Ridley (born 1992), British film and television actress
Daisy Riley Lloyd (1928–2019), American politician
Daisy Romualdez, Filipino actress
Daisy Rosario, American public radio personality and producer
Daisy Rossi (1879–1974), Australian artist, interior designer, and writer
Daisy Roulland-Dussoix (1936–2014), Swiss molecular microbiologist
Daisy Schjelderup (1916–1991), Norwegian translator and writer
Daisy Shah (born 1984), Indian model, dancer, and film actress
Daisy Solomon (1882–1978), British suffragette
Daisy Soros, Hungarian-born American philanthropist
Daisy Speranza, French tennis player
Daisy St. John (1877–1956), English international badminton player
Daisy Sweeney (1920–2017), Canadian Classical music and piano teacher
Daisy Sylvan (1874–?), Italian film studio owner, producer, director, and actress in the silent era
Daisy Syron Russell, English singer
Daisy Tahan, American actress
Daisy Tapley (1882–1925), American classical singer and vaudeville performer
Daisy Theresa Borne (1906–1998), British sculptor
Daisy Torres, Nicaraguan politician
Daisy Tourné (born 1951), Uruguayan politician
Daisy Turner, (1883–1988), American storyteller and poet
Daisy Vaithilingam (1925–2014), Singaporean social worker
Daisy Voisin (1924–1991), Trinidad and Tobago singer and composer
Daisy von Scherler Mayer (born 1966), American film and television director
Daisy Voog (born 1932), Estonian-German mountain climber
Daisy W. Okocha (born 1951), Nigerian lawyer
Daisy Wai, Canadian politician
Daisy Waite (born 2005), English-Chinese actress
Daisy Walker (born 2002), Australian rules footballer
Daisy Waterstone (born 1994), British actress
Daisy Waugh (born 1967), English journalist, travel writer, novelist, and television presenter
Daisy Webster (1911–2004), Canadian educator, author, and political figure
Daisy Whitney, American multimedia reporter
Daisy Winas (born 1986), Papua New Guinean footballer
Daisy Wood (1877–1961), English music hall singer
Daisy Wood-Davis (born 1990), British singer and actress
Daisy Yen Wu (1902–1993), Chinese biologist
Daisy Youngblood (born 1945), American sculptor and ceramicist
Daisy Zamora (born 1950), Latin American poet

Animals

 Daisy (dog) (1993–2006), a dog belonging to Rudolph Moshammer
 Daisy, a meerkat in the series Meerkat Manor
 Daisy, an orangutan in the series Orangutan Island

Fictional characters

 Daisy (Keeping Up Appearances), from the British comedy television series, portrayed by actress Judy Cornwell
 Daisy (Thomas the Tank Engine), railway engine in the television series
 Daisy the Diesel Rail-Car, diesel railcar, painted green with yellow lining from the Rev. W. Awdry's The Railway Series
 Daisy, Lily, and Violet, Kanto Gym Leaders in Pokémon and Misty's sisters
 Princess Daisy, a character in the Super Mario series
 Daisy Bell, an 1892 song involving a bicycle built for two
 Daisy, a character of Fire Emblem: Genealogy of the Holy War
 Daisy Duck, a Walt Disney cartoon and comic book character, first appearing in 1940
 Daisy, young boy, main character of Baby with the Bathwater
 Daisy, a character from Toy Story 3
 Daisy, Bumstead family's dog in the comic strip Blondie
 Daisy, Charlie's porn star client in Californication
 Daisy, local stable owner in Look to the Lady
 Daisy, animated tall orange/yellow/green daisy in Oswald
 Daisy, a character in Spaced
 Daisy, Sweet's girlfriend on Bones
 Daisy Buchanan, in F. Scott Fitzgerald's novella The Great Gatsby
 The title character of the Henry James novella Daisy Miller
 Daisy and Poppy, the fairy twins on Ben and Holly's Little Kingdom
 Daisy, title character of the manga Dengeki Daisy
 Daisy Fuller, in the film The Curious Case of Benjamin Button
 Daisy Carter, from the American CBS soap opera The Young and the Restless
 Daisy Domergue female protagonist in The Hateful Eight film 
 Daisy Duke, The Dukes of Hazzard
 Daisy, in the TV series Grey's Anatomy
 Daisy, a character from the video game Evolve
 Daisy Johnson, a Marvel Comics superheroine
 Daisy Jones, fictional lead singer of Daisy Jones & The Six
 Daisy Mason, a kitchen maid in the TV series Downton Abbey
 Daisy, a pony in the animated series My Little Pony: Friendship Is Magic
 Daisy Renton (also known as Eva Smith), central character in the 1912 English play An Inspector Calls by J.B. Priestly
 Margaret 'Daisy' Daykin, one of the Five Find-Outers in the series of children's mystery books by Enid Blyton
 Daizy, a character in Wow! Wow! Wubbzy!
 Daisy the Bunny, one of the main characters in Nature Cat
 Daisy Adair, a character in Dead Like Me
 Daisy Fitzroy, leader of the Vox Populi in Bioshock Infinite
 Dress Up Daisy, a dress up doll from Doc McStuffins
 Daisy, a ghoul merchant from the video game Fallout 4
 Daisy Salinas from Gotta Kick It Up!
 Daisy Midgeley, a character from Coronation Street
 Daisy, a character from the Gorgeous Ladies of Wrestling
 Daisy, a cat character from the book series Warriors

See also 
 
 
 Daisy (nickname), people with the nickname Daisy

References

English feminine given names
Given names derived from plants or flowers

ko:데이지 공주